is a village located in Niigata Prefecture, Japan. , the village had an estimated population of 353, and a population density of 36.1 persons per km.

Geography
The village is located on Awashima Island, located in the Sea of Japan off the coast of Murakami, Niigata, to which it is connected by ferry.

Climate
Awashimaura has a humid climate (Köppen Cfa) characterized by warm, wet summers and cold winters with heavy snowfall.  The average annual temperature in Awashimaura is 12.0 °C. The average annual rainfall is 2059 mm with September as the wettest month. The temperatures are highest on average in August, at around 25.1 °C, and lowest in January, at around 0.5 °C.

Demographics
Per Japanese census data, the population of Awashimaura has declined steadily over the past 50 years.

History
The island of Awashima has been inhabited since prehistoric times, and fragments of Jōmon period pottery have been found. The Asuka period general Abe no Hirafu conquered the island from its native Emishi inhabitants and brought it under the control of the Yamato dynasty. During the Edo period, the island passed between Murakami Domain, Shōnai Domain and direct control by the Tokugawa Shogunate several times. During the Boshin War, the Schnell brothers offloaded weapons for Shōnai Domain at Awashima. After the Meiji restoration, the village of Asahimaura was created in 1909 as part of Iwafune District, Niigata Prefecture. The epicentre of the 1964 Niigata earthquake was near Awashima, and many of the buildings in Awashimaura were damaged or destroyed.

Economy

The main industries of Awashimaura are seasonal tourism and commercial fishing.

Education
The village has two schools, Awashimaura Village Elementary School and Awashimaura Village Junior High School. There are also programs for study abroad and visiting students.

Transportation

Sea
 Awashima Kisen Ferry
Iwafune (Murakami) - Uchiura (Awashimaura)

See also
 Awashima Island, Niigata

References

External links

Official Website 

Villages in Niigata Prefecture
Populated coastal places in Japan
Awashimaura, Niigata